Bryan Bridges (born December 27, 1985 in Victoria, British Columbia) is a Canadian former professional ice hockey goaltender.

Playing career
Bridges played major junior hockey in the Western Hockey League (WHL) for five seasons with the Kootenay Ice and Seattle Thunderbirds. While playing for the Ice 2001–02 he won the memorial cup.   While playing with the Thunderbirds in 2004–05, he tied Kelly Guard for the WHL record for most shutouts in a season with 13.  The next season, Bridges established the league record for most shutouts all-time with 21 (matched by Leland Irving in 2007–08, then surpassed by Tyson Sexsmith in 2008–09).

Undrafted by a National Hockey League (NHL) club, Bridges entered the professional ranks in the ECHL.

Awards and honours

References

External links

1985 births
Sportspeople from Victoria, British Columbia
Ice hockey people from British Columbia
Canadian ice hockey goaltenders
Kootenay Ice players
Seattle Thunderbirds players
Las Vegas Wranglers players
Victoria Salmon Kings players
Reading Royals players
Colorado Eagles players
Elmira Jackals (ECHL) players
Living people
Canadian expatriate ice hockey players in the United States